Sterley is a municipality in the district of Lauenburg, in Schleswig-Holstein, Germany.

See also
Gudow-Sterley

References

Municipalities in Schleswig-Holstein
Herzogtum Lauenburg